REM is the 1988 EP released by the Chicago-based band Green.  The EP was titled as such in response to R.E.M.'s release of the album Green. Both tracks were included on the European release of the band's Elaine MacKenzie album.

Track listing
 "My Tears Are Dry (Now)"
 "Love on This Air"

Personnel
 Rich Clifton - drums
 Ken Kurson - bass, keyboards
 Jeff Lescher - guitar

References

External links

Elaine MacKenzie - Lyrics on the official Green website

1988 EPs
R.E.M.
Green (band) albums
Pravda Records EPs
Albums produced by Iain Burgess